Orycon is Portland, Oregon's annual science fiction/fantasy convention, held in November since 1979.

Event history 

The one-day Symposium in 1978 was held at Portland State University. OryCon was held at the Lloyd Center Sheraton in 1979, at the Portland Hilton 1980-83 and 1985, at the Portland Cosmopolitan Hotel in 1984, at the Red Lion/Lloyd Center (formerly the Lloyd Center Sheraton) in 1986, at the Red Lion/Doubletree Columbia River Hotel from 1987 to 2003, at the Marriott (waterfront downtown) from 2003 to 2008, at the Red Lion/Lloyd Center beginning 2009.

Highlights
Orycon promotes science fiction and fantasy works of all kinds.

There are many panels and workshops discussing topics from how to write a great science fiction novel to current events in science, as well as numerous filk sessions and concerts. Some of the recent panel topics have included:

Writing
When is enough research too much? 
How to write about something you don't really know about 
Using Your Imagination to Write and Draw 
Inventing Languages: Alien Linguistics 
Balancing Writing with Family/Real Life—Deadlines vs. diapers
Current events
What impact does technology really have on history 
Murdering stemcells and frankenfood: modern biology and the far left and right 
The web in 2015 - a look ahead 
The rest of the world's last year in space/Japanese Space Program. What they've done, what they are doing, what they have planned.
Costuming
Making an original costume: What you need to get started 
Fabric manipulation-How to twist, dye, stitch, fold, pleat and otherwise bully your fabric into submission
Period costumes beyond Victorian and medieval: Why don't we see more eras? 
Costuming 101: Pattern bashing for beginners
Art
Art Jam - Everybody Draws 
Selling the Offspring: Your Emotional Investment in Your Art and How Much do You Charge for It?
The Business of Art
My inspiration - My art: Why I did what I did

The Susan C Petrey Scholarship Fund Auction awards scholarships to the Clarion Science Fiction Writers' Workshop (both in the East and West)

The Endeavour Award
The Endeavour Award is presented to a distinguished science fiction or fantasy book written by a Pacific Northwest author or authors and published in the previous year.

Finalists for 2012
Anna Dressed in Blood by Kendare Blake (Tor)
City of Ruins by Kristine Kathryn Rusch (Pyr)
River Marked by Patricia Briggs (Ace)
Robopocalypse by Daniel H. Wilson (Doubleday)
When the Saints by Dave Duncan (Tor)

2011 Winner
 Dreadnought by Cherie Priest

External links
Orycon website
OSFCI links to past Orycons
Endeavour Award webpage
Oregon Science Fiction Conventions, Inc. (OSFCI)
Game Storm website

Culture of Portland, Oregon
Science fiction conventions in the United States
Annual events in Portland, Oregon